This article lists events that occurred during 1978 in Estonia.

Incumbents

Events
 28 September – one of the last Forest Brother guerilla movement fighter August Sabbe was discovered and killed in Estonia.

Births
12 February – Silver Meikar, Estonian politician
7 October – Lauri Leis, Estonian triple jumper

Deaths

References

 
1970s in Estonia
Estonia
Estonia
Years of the 20th century in Estonia